Dragalić is a municipality in Brod-Posavina County, Croatia. It is around 7 km west of Nova Gradiška.

As of 2011, there were 1,361 inhabitants, in the following settlements:
 Donji Bogićevci, population 84
 Dragalić, population 559
 Gorice, population 175
 Mašić, population 266
 Medari, population 177
 Poljane, population 100

80% of the population declared themselves Croats, 17.85% Serbs.

Dragalić is an underdeveloped municipality which is statistically classified as a First Category Area of Special State Concern by the Government of Croatia.

References

 

Municipalities of Croatia
Populated places in Brod-Posavina County